The 1944–45 Tercera División was the 9th edition of the Spanish third national tier. The competition was divided into 3 phases.

League tables

Group I

Group II

Group III

Group IV

Group V

Group VI

Group VII

Group VIII

Group IX

Promotion playoff

First round

Group I

Group II

Group III

Second round

Final Round

Relegation playoff

Group V

First round

Final Round

Notes

External links
www.rsssf.com

Tercera División seasons
3
Spain